Smiubelgen is a mountain range in Innlandet county, Norway. It is located in the western part of Rondane National Park, separated from the eastern part by the lake Rondvatnet. The Smiubelgen mountains have sharper ridges than the eastern part of Rondane. The mountain range is located in Sel Municipality and Dovre Municipality.

The meaning of the name is 'the blacksmith's bellows'. (See also Storsmeden and Veslesmeden.)

Mountains in the Smiubelgen area include:
 Trolltinden  (earlier Sagtinden)
 Storsmeden 
 Veslesmeden 
 Steet 
 Ljosåbelgen 
 Bråkedalsbelgen

See also
List of mountains of Norway

References

Mountains of Innlandet
Landforms of Innlandet
Mountain ranges of Norway
Sel
Dovre